Erwin Ramdani (born 3 November 1993, in Bandung) is an Indonesian professional footballer who plays as a left winger and attacking midfielder for Liga 1 club Persib Bandung. He is also an active TNI-AD soldier.

Club career 
Ramdani was born in Bandung Regency, in Bojongsoang sub-district. He first joined local football academy in Bandung, SSB UNI, and later Persib Bandung U-21. In 2014, Ramdani was signed by PSGC Ciamis for Liga Indonesia Premier Division that year.

Ramdani later joined PS TNI in 2016 for two seasons, and PSMS Medan for 2018 season.

PSMS Medan
He signed a contract with another Indonesian club PSMS Medan to play in 2018 Liga 1. Ramdani made his league debut on 31 March 2018 in a match against Bhayangkara. On 16 September 2018, Ramdani scored his first goal for the club, scoring in a 1–1 draw over Badak Lampung in the Liga 1.

Persib Bandung
He would return to his hometown club Persib Bandung in 2019 where he used to play for their U21 squad, he made his league debut for Persib Bandung on 18 May 2019 in a win 3–0 against Persipura Jayapura, he coming as a substitute for Febri Hariyadi in the 76th minute. He scored his first goal for Persib in a match against PSS Sleman during injury time on 30 August 2019. On 4 November 2021, he scored his first league goals of the season in a 1–3 win over Persela Lamongan.

Career Statistics 
27 February 2023

References

External links
 

1993 births
Living people
Indonesian footballers
Sportspeople from Bandung
Sportspeople from West Java
PSMS Medan players
PS TIRA players
Persib Bandung players
Indonesian Premier Division players
Liga 1 (Indonesia) players
Association football midfielders
Sundanese people